Francisco Javier Balmaseda Jullien ( – ) was a Cuban writer. 

In 1846 he published, at Havana, Rimas Cubanas and in 1861, Fábulas Morales. Some years later he published the novel Misterios de una Cabaña, a work on political economy, and another on agriculture. In 1869 Balmaseda was banished and sent to Fernando Po with many other revolutionists, and in 1871 he published a narrative under the title of Los Confinados á Fernando Po. Francisco Javier Balmaseda died on 17 February 1907.

External links
 "Francisco Javier Balmaseda Jullien (1823-1907): Biografía" (Spanish), Revista electrónica de Veterinaria Vol. 11 No. 9 Sept 2010.

  

Created via preloaddraft
1823 births
1907 deaths
Cuban writers